Two ships of the United States Navy have been named Eastport:

 , was a partially completed ironclad, captured from the Confederates on 7 February 1862 and scuttled on 26 April 1864.
 , was commissioned 18 October 1918, transported cargo during World War I and was decommissioned 19 June 1919.

United States Navy ship names